Guantánamo Bay is a bay in Guantánamo Province at the southeastern end of Cuba. It is the largest harbor on the south side of the island and it is surrounded by steep hills which create an enclave that is cut off from its immediate hinterland.

The United States assumed territorial control over the southern portion of Guantánamo Bay under the 1903 Lease. The United States exercises jurisdiction and control over this territory, while recognizing that Cuba retains ultimate sovereignty. The government of Cuba regards the U.S. presence in Guantánamo Bay as an illegal occupation on the basis that the Cuban–American Treaty "was obtained by threat of force and is in violation of international law." Some legal scholars judge that the lease may be voidable. It is the home of the Guantanamo Bay Naval Base and the Guantanamo Bay detention camp located within the base, which are both governed by the United States. Since the 1959 revolution, Cuba has only cashed a single lease payment from the United States government.

Climate
Guantánamo Bay has a hot semi-arid climate according to the Köppen climate classification, with high temperatures throughout the year. Rainfall is rather low, and it is one of the driest regions in Cuba.

U.S. control of Guantánamo Bay

The United States first seized Guantánamo Bay and established a naval base there in 1898 during the Spanish–American War in the Battle of Guantánamo Bay.  In 1903, the United States and Cuba signed a lease granting the United States permission to use the land as a coaling and naval station. The lease satisfied the Platt Amendment, passed by the United States Congress, which stated that a naval base at "certain specific points agreed upon by the President of the United States" was needed to "enable the United States to maintain independence of Cuba."

History

The original inhabitants of the bay, the Taínos, called it Guantánamo. Christopher Columbus landed in 1494, naming it Puerto Grande. On landing, Columbus' crew found Taíno fishermen preparing a feast for the local chieftain.  When Spanish settlers took control of Cuba, the bay became a vital harbor on the south side of the island.

The bay was briefly renamed as "Cumberland Bay" when a British expeditionary force captured it in 1741 during the War of Jenkins' Ear. British Admiral, Edward Vernon, arrived with a force of eight warships and 4,000 soldiers with plans to march on Santiago de Cuba. However, local Spanish colonial troops defeated him and forced him to withdraw or face becoming a prisoner.  In late 1760, two Royal Navy frigates,  and HMS Boreas cut out the French privateers Vainquer and Mackau, which were hiding in the bay. The French were also forced to burn the Guespe, another privateer, to prevent her capture.

During the Spanish–American War of 1898, the U.S. Navy fleet attacking Santiago needed shelter from the summer hurricane season. They chose Guantánamo because of its excellent harbor. U.S. Marines landed with naval support in the invasion of Guantánamo Bay in June 1898. As they moved inland, however, Spanish resistance increased and the Marines required support from Cuban scouts.

Guantanamo Bay interested U.S military planners due to its geographical location in the Caribbean. It became a strategic location in defending the Panama Canal and the southern US coast. It was also a natural haven for naval vessels in the region. Due to other factors, it pushed the US to consider the area as a suitable location for a Naval Base. 

The Guantanamo Bay Naval Base surrounds the southern portion of the bay. 
It was established in 1898, when the United States took control of Cuba from Spain following the Spanish–American War. The newly-formed American protectorate incorporated the Platt Amendment in the 1901 Cuban Constitution. Tomás Estrada Palma, the first President of Cuba,  offered a perpetual lease for the area around Guantánamo Bay on February 23, 1903. The 1903 Cuban–American Treaty of Relations held, among other things, that the United States, for the purposes of operating coaling and naval stations, has "complete jurisdiction and control" of the Guantánamo Bay, while recognizing that the Republic of Cuba retains ultimate sovereignty.

In 1934, a new Cuban-American Treaty of Relations, reaffirming the lease, granted Cuba and its trading partners free access through the bay, modified the lease payment from $2,000 in U.S. gold coins per year to the 1934 equivalent value of $4,085 in U.S. dollars, and made the lease permanent unless both governments agreed to break it, or until the U.S. abandoned the base property.

After the Cuban Revolution of 1953–1959, United States President Dwight D. Eisenhower insisted that the status of the base remain unchanged, despite the objections of Fidel Castro. Since then, the Cuban government has cashed only one of the rent checks from the U.S. government, and even then, according to Castro, only because of "confusion" in the early days of the Cuban revolution. The remaining uncashed checks, made out to "Treasurer General of the Republic" (a title that ceased to exist after the revolution), were kept in Castro's office, stuffed into a desk drawer.

In the 1990s, the United States used Guantanamo Bay as a processing center for asylum-seekers and as a camp for HIV-positive refugees. Over a period of six months, the USA interned over 30,000 Haitian refugees in Guantanamo, while another 30,000 fled to the Dominican Republic. Eventually, the USA admitted 10,747 of the Haitians to refugee status in the United States. Most of the refugees were housed in a tent city on the re-purposed airstrip that would later be used to house the complex used for the Guantanamo military commissions. The refugees who represented discipline or security problems were held on the site that later became Camp XRay, the initial site of the Guantanamo Bay detention camp. In August 1994, rioting broke out in the detention camps and 20 U.S. military police and 45 Haitians were injured.

Since 2002, the base has included the detainment camp for individuals deemed of risk to United States national security. In 2009, the U.S. President, Barack Obama, gave orders for the detention camp to close by January 22, 2010. , it remains open due to a congressional refusal of funds for its closure.

Alfred-Maurice de Zayas has argued that the 1903 lease agreement was imposed on Cuba under duress and was a treaty between unequals, no longer compatible with modern international law, and voidable ex nunc. He makes six suggestions for a peaceful settlement, including following the procedure outlined in the Vienna Convention on the Law of Treaties.

See also
 Cuba–United States relations
 Guantanamo Bay detention camp
 Platt Amendment: Document to guarantee U.S. Navy lease in Cuba

References

External links

Read Congressional Research Service (CRS) Reports regarding Guantánamo Detainees
U.S. Naval Station Guantanamo Bay — The United States' oldest overseas Naval Base
Guantánamo: U.S. Black Hole
All-Party Parliamentary Group on Guantanamo Bay (APPG-GB)
Camp Delta (detainee) Map
U.S. Naval Base Guantanamo Bay Map
Guantanamo Docket
Human Rights First; In Pursuit of Justice: Prosecuting Terrorism Cases in the Federal Courts (2009)

Guantanamo Bay
Geography of Guantánamo Province
Bays of Cuba
Spanish–American War
Cuba–United States relations